Grip is a former municipality in Møre og Romsdal county, Norway. With a land area of only  and a population of 104, Grip was the smallest municipality in Norway during its existence from 1897 until it merged with Kristiansund in 1964. Grip municipality included all the islands in the Grip archipelago. The administrative centre of the municipality was the one fishing village in the municipality, known as Gripholmen, where the historic Grip Stave Church is located.

History

The formannskapsdistrikt law of 1837 required that every parish in Norway should be constituted as a municipality on 1 January 1838. It also required that parishes composed of a town with a rural district should be divided into two municipalities (a town municipality and a rural municipality). In 1837, the town of Kristiansund and the rural districts of Frei and Grip were part of the same parish.  Frei became its own municipality under the new law, but Grip had no men with the right to vote so it was not considered a municipality, rather it was governed by Frei. Prior to 1884, the right to vote was in Norway was mostly limited to men with property. In a fishing village, such as Grip, where one merchant in the town owned all the houses, nobody had the right to vote, so Grip had no municipal government. Through constitutional changes in 1884, the right to vote was extended to all men who paid taxes.  Since the fishermen in Grip paid income taxes, Grip finally had a voting population. Grip municipality was officially incorporated in 1897 with a population of 198 when it was separated from Frei.

Grip municipality bought the fishing village from the merchant Ludvig Williamsen in 1909. The entire community had previously been the property of a merchant in Kristiansund, not including the church, school and three private houses. The municipality then began selling the houses to their inhabitants. A census in 1910 showed a population of 187.

During the 1960s, there were many municipal mergers across Norway due to the work of the Schei Committee. On 1 January 1964, the municipality of Grip (population: 104) was merged with the town of Kristiansund (population: 17,275) and the Dale area of the municipality of Bremsnes (population: 963) to form a new, larger Kristiansund Municipality.

Etymology
The name is first recorded in 1338 as "Gripar" which is a plural form of the word (which makes sense since Grip is an archipelago). The etymology of the name is uncertain, but it is maybe related to the Norse verb  which means "catch", "seize", or "grip". If this is the case, then it probably refers to the catching of fish here.

Government
All municipalities in Norway, including Grip, are responsible for primary education (through 10th grade), outpatient health services, senior citizen services, unemployment and other social services, zoning, economic development, and municipal roads.  The municipality is governed by a municipal council of elected representatives, which in turn elects a mayor.

Municipal council
The municipal council  of Grip was made up of 13 representatives that were elected to four year terms.  The party breakdown of the final municipal council was as follows:

Media gallery

See also
List of former municipalities of Norway

References

Kristiansund
Former municipalities of Norway
1897 establishments in Norway
1964 disestablishments in Norway